HD 150193 is a binary star system in the constellation of Ophiuchus. The primary star was identified as a Herbig Ae/Be star with a strong solar wind, losing approximately a tenth of solar mass per million years. It does host a very small debris disk, likely due to disk truncation by the nearby stellar companion. The disk is inclined 38° to the plane of sky. It appears to be highly evolved and asymmetric, with indications of flattening and grains growth. 

The companion HD  150193B, is a T Tauri young star with a projected separation of 166 AU.

The binary HD 150193 is part of the Upper Scorpius subgroup of Scorpius–Centaurus star-forming region.

References

Ophiuchus (constellation)
Herbig Ae/Be stars
Scorpius–Centaurus association
150193
081624
CD-23 12887
Ophiuchi, V2307
J16401792-2353452
Binary stars
T Tauri stars
Orion variables